Ludovic Hubler is a French traveller, most famous for his 5-year tour of the world completed entirely by hitchhiking (car, boat, etc.). He wrote the travel book Le Monde en stop, rewarded by the 2010 Pierre Loti award.

Biography

Childhood
Born on September 11, 1977, Ludovic Hubler is the son of Monique and Jacques Hubler, and is the brother of the consultant Eric Hubler and the photographer Marc Hubler. Passionate about football and geography, he grew up in Wasselonne and Obernai in the Alsace region in eastern France. In June 2002, he graduated from EM Strasbourg Business School with a Master of Science in Management.

Tour of the world by hitchhiking
At the end of his Master's program, believing that discovering the realities of the world was a valuable pre-requisite to entering the work world, Ludovic Hubler decided to start a tour of the world using hitchhiking as his only means of transportation.

This adventure, which he baptized his, "life Phd", lasted 5 years during 2003-2008. From "sail-boat hitchhiking" to cross the Atlantic and the Pacific, to "ice breaker hitchhiking" to reach Antarctica; from crossing the Sahara desert or visiting countries as notorious as Colombia and Afghanistan, Ludovic used his thumb in all kinds of improbable and difficult to imagine situations.

His encounters were as numerous as they were diverse. Among the most striking is his meeting with the 14th Dalai Lama, who received him in his hometown Dharamshala (India) in 2007 but so were some of the thousands of students in all corners of the world with whom he shared his story.

Totalling the 5 years, the 170,000 kilometers travelled, the 59 countries visited, the hundreds of lectures given and recalling gratitude for the help of over 1,300 drivers gives an idea of the richness of Ludovic's trip - an adventure that was shared on a daily basis with pediatric cancer patients at the Hospital of Strasbourg, back home in Strasbourg, France.

After the tour
Ludovic Hubler now lives in Menton and works as Head of Programmes and Field Operations for Peace and Sport, L'organisation pour la paix par le sport placed under the High Patronage of Prince Albert II of Monaco.

He continues to regularly give lectures sharing his journey and what he learned on the road. Ludovic Hubler is now married to Panamanian native Marisol Richards Espinosa, whom he met during the trip in September 2005, as he hitchhiked through Panama.

Bibliography 
2009 : Le Monde en stop, 5 années à l'école de la vie, éditions Géorama. 2010 Pierre Loti award, rewarding the best travel book of the year 2009.

References

Tour of the world by hitchhiking

Press
    Article in the magazine oopartir.com
  Article A/R Magazine
  |titre=Le monde en stop|Article Instinct Voyageur
  Article La Depêche
  RTL
  Article Sud Ouest
  Article Bangkok Magazine, Thaïlande
  Article Road Junky
  Article The Hindu
  Article Tuoi Tre, Viêt-nam
  Article Vietbao, Viêt-nam
  Article The Star Malaisie
  Article Tribune India, Inde
  Livre Homo-travel
  Article Geht Hitchhiking

TV
  Reportage CBS Texas, USA
  Reportage Floride, USA
  Reportage TV Sohu, Chine
   Reportage Dragon TV, Chine
  Reportage One TV, Nouvelle-Zélande
  Reportage Televisa, Mexique
  Reportage One TV, Nouvelle-Zélande

Peace and Sport 
  Article ITTF aux championnats du monde de Tennis de Table, présentation du programme Peace and Sport-ITTF "Table Tennis for Peace"
  2012 World championships in Dortmund

External links 
 Official site of Ludovic Hubler
 Interview e-marginalia web site
 TV report Incroyable mais Vrai

1977 births
Living people
French travel writers
People from Bar-le-Duc
University of Strasbourg alumni
Circumnavigators of the globe
French male non-fiction writers